is a passenger railway station located in the city of Shikokuchūō, Ehime Prefecture, Japan. It is operated by JR Shikoku and has the station number "Y23".

Lines
Iyo-Mishima Station is served by the JR Shikoku Yosan Line and is located 77.6 km from the beginning of the line at Takamatsu. Yosan line local, Rapid Sunport, and Nanpū Relay services stop at the station.

The following JR Shikoku limited express services also stop at the station:

Layout
The station consists of an island platform and a side platform serving three tracks. The present station building, completed in 1975 is a  structure where passenger facilities are located on a bridge which spans the tracks. Besides providing access to all the platforms, the enclosed bridge structure houses the ticket gates, a waiting room, shops, a JR Midori no Madoguchi ticket window and a JR Travel Centre (Warp Plaza). A passing loop runs on the side of platform/track 1. In addition, a large freight yard is located just to the east of the station which is leased by a paper manufacturer.

Adjacent stations

History
At that time the station was operated by Japanese Government Railways, later becoming Japanese National Railways (JNR). With the privatization of JNR on 1 April 1987, control of the station passed to JR Shikoku and JR Freight.

Surrounding area
Shikokuchuo City Hall (about 1km)
Shikokuchuo Municipal Mishima Elementary School
 Ehime Prefectural Mishima High School

See also
 List of railway stations in Japan

References

External links
Official home page

External links
Iyo-Mishima Station (JR Shikoku)

Railway stations in Ehime Prefecture
Railway stations in Japan opened in 1917
Shikokuchūō